Stanmore is a hamlet in Berkshire, England. In the 2011 Census it was included in the civil parish of Beedon. It is situated west of the A34, 7 miles north of Newbury, Berkshire. The other nearby town is Abingdon and nearby villages are Beedon, East Ilsley, and Peasemore

See also
 List of civil parishes in Berkshire

Hamlets in Berkshire
West Berkshire District